An acoustic membrane is a thin layer that vibrates and is used in acoustics to produce or transfer sound, such as a drum, microphone, or loudspeaker.

See also 
 Membranophone
 Vibrations of a circular membrane

Acoustics
Sound